Death of a Cheerleader may refer to:

 Death of a Cheerleader (album), by Pom Pom Squad in 2021
 A Friend to Die For, 1994 film that is also known as "Death of a Cheerleader"
 Death of a Cheerleader (2019 film) , a remake of the 1994 film
 Riverdale: Death of a Cheerleader, 2020 book by Micol Ostow